"It's Over Now" is a song by German recording artist Jeanette. Written by Frank Johnes, Bodybrain, and Kristina "Wonderbra" Bach, it was produced by Thorsten Brötzmann and Werner Becker for the gold edition of her third studio album Rock My Life (2003). Released as a single in March 2003, the ballad peaked at number six on the German Singles Chart, also reaching the top twenty on the Austrian Singles Chart. Bach re-recorded a German language version of the song, entitled "Ich tanz allein," for her album Leb dein Gefühl (2004).

Formats and track listings

Charts

Weekly charts

Year-end charts

References

2003 songs
Jeanette Biedermann songs
Universal Music Group singles
Songs written by Kristina Bach
2000s ballads